The 2011–12 Elon Phoenix men's basketball team represents Elon University during the 2011–12 college basketball season. This is head coach Matt Matheny's third season at Elon. The Phoenix compete in the Southern Conference's North Division and play their home games at Alumni Gym.

Roster

Schedule and results

|-
!colspan=9| Exhibition

|-
!colspan=9| Regular season

|-
!colspan=9| Southern Conference tournament

References

Elon
Elon Phoenix men's basketball seasons